Calixto García (1836–1898) was a Cuban general in three Cuban uprisings in the Cuban War for Independence. General Garcia may also refer to:

Cesar Garcia (fl. 1970s–2010s), former Director-General of the National Intelligence Coordinating Agency of the Republic of the Philippines
Fernando Romeo Lucas García (1924–2006), Guatemalan general
José Guillermo García (born 1933), Salvadoran Army brigadier general
Kjell Eugenio Laugerud García] (1930–2009), Guatemalan brigadier general who served as the 36th President of Guatemala